Peter Wilson was a Scottish-American football defender who played professionally in Scotland and the United States. He is a member of the National Soccer Hall of Fame.

He played for St Johnstone in the Scottish Football League during the 1896–1897 season. He then moved to the United States where he remained for the rest of his life. He played for the Kearny Scottish-Americans – possibly in the National Association Football League; Paterson Rangers, a team in Pawtucket – possibly the Pawtucket Rangers; and the Philadelphia Hibernian. Dates and leagues are unknown.

A P. Wilson is listed as a left back with Tacony Field Club in 1910.

Wilson was inducted into the National Soccer Hall of Fame in 1950.

References

External links
 National Soccer Hall of Fame

Scottish footballers
St Johnstone F.C. players
Scottish emigrants to the United States
American soccer players
Philadelphia Hibernian players
National Association Football League players
Kearny Scots (NAFBL) players
Pawtucket Rangers players
National Soccer Hall of Fame members
Association football defenders
Scottish expatriate sportspeople in the United States
Expatriate soccer players in the United States
Scottish expatriate footballers
19th-century births
20th-century deaths
Year of birth missing

Year of death missing